George Englund (June 22, 1926 – September 14, 2017) was an American film editor, director, producer, and actor.

Biography
Englund was born George Howe Ripley in Washington, D.C., the son of actress Mabel Albertson and Harold Austin Ripley. His uncle was actor Jack Albertson. After his parents divorced, his mother married Ken Englund, whose surname young George adopted. Englund was married to actress Cloris Leachman from 1953 to 1979. They had five children: Adam, Bryan (died 1986), George, Jr., Morgan and Dinah. His mother was Jewish. On April 10, 1980, he married actress Bonnie Graves. They had two children: Graves and Max (died 1993). The couple divorced in 1992. For the last ten years of his life, his companion was Frances Bowes, art collector, patron and vice-chairlady at Dia Center for the Arts.

He was best friends with Marlon Brando, who starred in Englund's 1963 film The Ugly American, and wrote a memoir about their friendship.

Selected directorial filmography
 The Ugly American (1963)
 Signpost to Murder (1965)
 Zachariah (1971)
 Snow Job (1972)
 A Christmas to Remember (1978, TV movie)
 The Vegas Strip War (1984, TV movie)

Death
Englund lived in Palm Springs, California, starting in 1997. He died at his home on September 14, 2017, at the age of 91 following a fall. His body was cremated.

References

External links
 

1926 births
2017 deaths
American film editors
American film directors
American film producers
20th-century American Jews
American male actors
Male actors from Palm Springs, California
American male screenwriters
American television directors
Television producers from California
English-language film directors
Male actors from Washington, D.C.
Screenwriters from Washington, D.C.
Accidental deaths from falls
Accidental deaths in California
21st-century American Jews